2009 Asian Martial Arts Games, the 1st and only Asian Martial Arts Games in history were a pancontinential martial arts multi-sport event held in Bangkok, Thailand from 1 to 9 August 2009 with 9 events contested. Due to Political crisis in Thailand And 2009 Swine Flu, the Bangkok Asian Martial Arts Games Organizing Committee (BAMAGOC) and the National Olympic Committee (NOC) of Thailand decided that Asian Martial Arts Games moved from the original schedule of 25 April to 3 May to 1 to 9 August. Four years later, the event merged with another Olympic Council of Asia (OCA) event – Asian Indoor Games to form the larger Asian Indoor and Martial Arts Games.

Emblem
The emblem comprises the letter "A" which stands for Asia that would include the Asian countries and population as well; while the letter "M" stands for Martial Arts Sports. The two connected letters are reflecting the meanings of modernity, activeness and simplicity; combining with the thoughts and cohesiveness of friendship and equality among the countries in Asia for the upcoming Martial Arts Games.

For the overall picture, it is a mixture of contemporary art, manifesting that Thailand is to act as the host of the Games. Red is the main color of the OCA, reflecting the color of the fight, standing for the color of the heart and colorizing the Asian art. Gold is the color of brightness of the Thai Kingdom and is the color for creativity and determination to organize the 1st Asian Martial Arts Games 2009.

Mascot
"Hanuman" is a white – creamy super monkey and considers it as the God of the ape which has every kind of fighting skill with strong determination of great success.

The Organizing Committee uses "Hanuman Yindee" as the Mascot as it wants to convey the message of the word "Yindee" which means proudness and gratification. Furthermore, the Organizing Committee is using the word "Yindee" as to extend to everybody a warm welcome and a chance of making continuous friendship and solidarity throughout the entire peoples of Asia.

Venues
 Indoor Stadium Huamark - Karate, Taekwondo
 Nimibutr Stadium - Muaythai
 Jhanthana Yingyong Gymnasium - Kickboxing
 Thai-Japanese Youth Center - Judo, Ju-jitsu, Kurash
 Silpa-archa Gymnasium in Suphan Buri - Wushu
 Chaofah Mahachakree Sirinthorn Gymnasium at Suphanburi Sport School in Suphan Buri - Pencak silat

Participating nations
37 out of the 45 Asian countries took part. Iran, North Korea, United Arab Emirates, Saudi Arabia and Timor-Leste did not compete. Iran, a favourite for a spot at the top of the leader board pulled out of the contest after fears of catching swine flu forced the Iranian National Olympic Committee to advise the country pull out of the contest. Palestine, Kyrgyzstan and Tajikistan did not have any competitors at the games but their athletes still counted in the draw in Taekwondo because of their late withdrawal.

Sports

Calendar

Medal table

References

External links
OCA Asian Martial Arts Games web page

Medal table

 
Asian Games, Martial Arts
Asian Games, Martial Arts
Asian Games, Martial Arts
Asian Games, Martial Arts
Asian Martial Arts Games
Asian Games, Martial Arts